Cercosaura manicata, the slender prionodactylus, is a species of lizard in the family Gymnophthalmidae. It is found in Ecuador, Peru, Bolivia, and Colombia.

References

Cercosaura
Reptiles described in 1881
Taxa named by Arthur William Edgar O'Shaughnessy